Phillip Dean Frye was a  Republican member of the North Carolina General Assembly representing the state's eighty-fourth House district, including constituents in Avery, Caldwell, Mitchell, and Yancey counties. A business owner from Spruce Pine, North Carolina, Frye served in his first state House term during the 2003–2004 session and his fifth and final term in the 2011–2012 session. He announced in 2011 that he would not run again in 2012 after the legislature passed a redistricting bill that put him in the same district with Rep. Mitch Gillespie.

In December 2007, Frye pleaded guilty to driving while impaired after being arrested on Christmas Eve.

Electoral history

2010

2008

2006

2004

2002

References

External links
Official Legislative page

Year of birth missing (living people)
Living people
Republican Party members of the North Carolina House of Representatives
People from Spruce Pine, North Carolina
21st-century American politicians